Brynjar Björn Gunnarsson (born 16 October 1975) is an Icelandic former footballer who last played for KR as a midfielder. Brynjar had previously played for Nottingham Forest, Stoke City, Watford and Reading in England as well as Vålerenga and Moss in Norway and Örgryte IS in Sweden. Gunnarsson is the current manager of HK in the Premier Division of Icelandic football, after helping them to a promotion in his first season with the team.

Club career
Brynjar was born in Reykjavík and started his career with local club KR, playing three seasons with their senior squad. Brynjar moved to Norway in 1998 to play for Vålerenga and Moss FK before joining Swedish club Örgryte IS in 1999. After a season at the Gamla Ullevi English club Stoke City paid a club-record fee of £600,000 for Brynjar, with him becoming one of a number of Scandinavian players at Stoke following a take over by a group of Icelandic businessmen. He played 30 times for Stoke 1999–2000 as Stoke lost to Gillingham in the play-offs. He did play in the 2000 Football League Trophy Final as Stoke beat 2–1. In 2000–01 Brynjar missed just three matches as Stoke again failed in the play-offs this time to Walsall but Brynjar did win the player of the year. He struggled with injury in 2001–02 as Stoke gained promotion by beating Brentford 2–0 in the play-off final. He played in 45 games in 2002–03 as Stoke narrowly avoided relegation and at the end of the season he left for Nottingham Forest on a free transfer.

He failed to make much of an impact at Forest and after making 14 appearances he re-joined Stoke on a short-term loan. He played three times for Stoke in 2003–04 until he was released by Forest at the end of the season.

Brynjar signed for Watford in the summer of 2004, after being released by Forest. He made 43 appearances in an impressive first season. However, Ray Lewington's replacement as Watford manager, Adrian Boothroyd, to some raised eyebrows from the Watford support, allowed Brynjar to leave for Reading for a nominal fee in the summer of 2005. He helped Reading win the Championship title in 2005–06 and stay in the Premier League in 2006–07 however relegation was suffered in 2007–08. He slowly drifted in and out of the Reading side and left the club having made 163 appearances for the club scoring ten goals.

Brynjar moved to KR again after about 15 years abroad in March 2013. After a season in which Brynjar helped KR win the league he retired as a player to become the assistant manager at fellow Úrvalsdeild outfit Stjarnan.

International career
Brynjar made his debut for Iceland in a June 1997 World Cup qualifying match against Macedonia. He was capped more than 70 times for Iceland, scoring five goals.

Career statistics

Club
Source:

A.  The "Other" column constitutes appearances and goals in the Football League play-offs, Football League Trophy, Icelandic Super Cup and the UEFA Europa League.

International
Source:

References

External links

1975 births
Living people
Brynjar Gunnarsson
Brynjar Gunnarsson
Brynjar Gunnarsson
Brynjar Gunnarsson
Brynjar Gunnarsson
Brynjar Gunnarsson
Brynjar Gunnarsson
Vålerenga Fotball players
Moss FK players
Örgryte IS players
Stoke City F.C. players
Nottingham Forest F.C. players
Watford F.C. players
Reading F.C. players
Expatriate footballers in Norway
Expatriate footballers in Sweden
Expatriate footballers in England
Brynjar Gunnarsson
Premier League players
Allsvenskan players
Eliteserien players
English Football League players
Association football midfielders
Stjarnan football managers
Brynjar Gunnarsson